Assam Science and Technology University is a state technical university located in Jalukbari, Guwahati, Assam, India. It was established in 2010 by the Assam Government under the Assam Science and Technology University Act 2009.

The university has signed a collaborative partnership agreement with Curtin University in Perth, Western Australia to improve the higher education, mainly in the field of technology and research.

Academics
Bachelor courses are typically four or three years of study; master courses are typically two or three years.

Affiliated institutions
, the institute has 18 affiliated institutions:

 Assam Engineering College, Guwahati
 Assam Institute of Management
 Barak Valley Engineering College
 Bineswar Brahma Engineering College
 Brahmaputra College
Dhemaji Engineering College
 Girijananda Chowdhury Institute of Management and Technology, Guwahati
 Girijananda Chowdhury Institute of Management and Technology, Tezpur
 Girijananda Chowdhury Institute of Pharmaceutical Science
 Golaghat Engineering College, Golaghat
 Guwahati College of Architecture
 Jorhat Engineering College, Jorhat
 Jorhat Institute of Science & Technology, Jorhat
 NETES Institute of Pharmaceutical Science, Mirza
 NETES Institute of Technology and Science, Mirza
 Pratiksha Institute of Pharmaceutical Sciences
 Scholar's Institute of Technology & Management 
In addition, the Royal School of Engineering & Technology was affiliated until academic session 2016–17.

References

External links 

Universities in Assam
Universities and colleges in Guwahati
2009 establishments in Assam
2010 establishments in Assam
Educational institutions established in 2009
Educational institutions established in 2010
State universities in Assam